The San Pedro Mountains mummy (known informally as Pedro) is a mummy discovered in Wyoming in the 1930s. Due to its unusual physical features and small stature, it has become a part of American folklore as well as ufology and cryptozoology. Mainstream scientific opinion considers "Pedro" to be the mummy of a malformed infant that was born with anencephaly.

In October 1932, while digging for gold in the San Pedro mountains, Carbon County, Wyoming, two prospectors, Cecil Mayne and Frank Carr, blasted their way through some thick rock that a large vein of gold continued into. When the dust settled, they saw they had opened up a small room, approximately 4 ft tall, 4 ft wide, and about 15 ft deep. This is where they said that they first saw the mummy of a tiny person.

This first mummy was examined using X-rays which determined that it was the body of an anencephalic infant "whose cranial deformity gave it the appearance of a miniature adult." A second mummy examined by University of Wyoming anthropologist George Gill and the Denver Children's Hospital in the 1990s was also shown to be an anencephalic infant. DNA testing showed it to be Native American and radiocarbon dating dated it to about 1700.

According to a July 7, 1979, article in the Casper Star-Tribune the first mummy started debates over whether it was a hoax, a baby, or one of the legendary "little people". The mummy ended up in Meeteetse, Wyoming at a local drug store where it was shown as an attraction for several years before it was bought by Ivan T. Goodman, a Casper, Wyoming businessman. The mummy was then passed on to Leonard Wadler, a New York businessman, and its present location is unknown.
 Seeking to prove evolution wrong, an offer of a $10,000 reward was made for the person who finds the missing mummy according to the Casper Star-Tribune.

Chiquita
After "Pedro" was lost, it wasn't until the 1990s that another discovery was made. After an appearance on television, Gill was shown the mummified remains of a baby like human. The Native American family that presented these remains had kept this mummy in their attic for generations. Her arms and legs were folded in the same way as "Pedro", which was seen as a direct connection between the two. Gill examined these mummified remains on three separate occasions, and he deduced that these were the remains of a little girl, and claimed that her birthdate was somewhere in the 1500s. Gill also presumed, that because of the stark similarities he observed with the burial procedures, that "Chiquita" and "Pedro" had a connection that went beyond their religious beliefs. With DNA research, they were able to find out that the baby was of Native American origin, despite the fact that she had blond hair. The anthropologist discovered that "Chiquita" had died as a result of anencephaly, which draws another connection to "Pedro", and strengthens Gills beliefs that the cause of "Pedro"'s death and mummification was due to his anencephaly.

With the suggestion that these two unique cases of mummified remains being closely related, and believers of the theory of the little people were quick to use this as an example as well. These legends go back in time throughout the Native American culture in the area, and the story leads people to wonder if these tales may be true. Called the Nimerigar, the stories that are told mention these beings to be around three feet tall. Throughout the Wind River Indian Reservation and the mountain ranges in Wyoming, stories of these beings describe them as magical, and were gifted with the healing arts. Even though they are described as possessing these abilities, they are depicted to be violent and were a threat to the local people. The name, Nimerigar, is said to mean "People Eaters", further stressing the fear that the locals felt around these creatures.

Stories of the Nimerigar are aplenty within the local culture. It is said to be a bad idea to make any of them angry, because they would attack the people who frustrated them with poisonous darts. There is also a story in Native American Mythology that directly relates to the condition of the heads of the mummified remains found in the area. Nimerigar also reportedly killed off the local community members that suffered from old age or sickness, and they were said to have done this with a "blow to the head".

The direct connection between the stories pertaining the race of tiny people, known as Nimerigar, attacking with a blow to the head allow theorists to make a direct connection to the remains of "Pedro" and "Chiquita". The theory of a race of "little people" in America has been peddled throughout history, and had been a topic of interest for Anthropologists, Scientists, and Geologists alike. It was widely reported in the New York Times and The Anthropological Journal in 1876 that a six acre graveyard was discovered in Coffee County, Tennessee and contained a tribe of people who were measured at around three feet of height. They were also said to have been found in sitting and standing positions, and were also found to have wisdom teeth, suggesting that they were not children. This is referred to as a pygmy grave, and is still a mystery in the sense that we do not know what these beings were doing all together in this grave. Also reported with this specific news, it was discovered that there was an eerily similar find at a site in Ohio, near Cochocton.

With these discoveries being brought to light with the finding of the "San Pedro Mummy", and years later "Chiquita", theorists were sure that these tales of an ancient civilization full of people who are considered to be little were to be true. It is a hard fact to swallow that there cannot be any more studies done on "Pedro" because he was lost. Many geologists and archaeologists still wonder about this discovery today, and with the advancement in technology since the remains were lost, we would undoubtedly be able to find out more from our studies.

The discovery of "Chiquita" in the attic of the Native American family also raises the question as to why this family made effort over a span of 500 years to protect these remains. This draws connections to different after death ceremonies throughout history around the world, which believe that mummification will help in certain ways when a person is set to encounter the afterlife.
Pygmy remains have caused speculation for ages, and the discovery of these beings creates direct connections to folklore which was previously believed to be fiction. It is also speculated that these could be alien remains due to their head shape and body shape, but most theorists let go of that idea when it is revealed that these are in fact human remains, which causes a whole new set of questions to arise. Surely, as more artifacts are found throughout time, if there was a time in history where an entire civilization of dwarfs was a possibility then we will find more evidence. It is more likely that the remains found in the mountains in Wyoming and in the attic of the Native American family were mummified because of post death religious practices enacted by the native people on the land at the time. The study of the question asking why these smaller humans were buried in different ways than it was previously believed is a common one when thinking over the findings of these mummies.

See also
 Shoshone
 Nimerigar, small people in North American legends
 Atacama skeleton
 Alyoshenka
 Koro-pok-guru, small people in Ainu folklore

References

 Photo of mummy

External links
 
 
 

Mummies
Shoshone
Archaeology of the United States
Pseudoarchaeology
Forteana
History of Wyoming